Fritillaria drenovskii is a rare European species of plants in the lily family, native to the Thrace region of northeastern Greece, as well as Blagoevgrad Province in southwestern Bulgaria.

The species is listed as "vulnerable" by the IUCN Red List.

See also
List of Balkan endemic plants

References

External links
Wildscreen Arkive Fritillaria (Fritillaria drenovskii) photos
Fritillaria Group, Alpine Garden Society, Fritillaria species D-F photos of several species including Fritillaria drenovskii

drenovskii
Flora of Greece
Flora of Bulgaria
Plants described in 1931